Delmar is a city in Clinton County, Iowa, United States. The population was 542 at the time of the 2020 census.

History
Delmar was platted in 1871, shortly after the railroad was built through the site. The name Delmar is said to be a combination of the names of six ladies on the first train to arrive into the station. Le Mars, Iowa was similarly so named.

Geography
Delmar is located at  (42.001744, -90.607683).

Demographics

2010 census
As of the census of 2010, there were 525 people, 213 households, and 145 families living in the city. The racial makeup of the city was 97.0% White, 1.5% African American, 0.2% Native American, 0.2% Asian, and 1.1% from two or more races. Hispanic or Latino of any race were 1.5% of the population.

There were 213 households, of which 33.8% had children under the age of 18 living with them, 54.0% were married couples living together, 8.0% had a female householder with no husband present, 6.1% had a male householder with no wife present, and 31.9% were non-families. 28.6% of all households were made up of individuals, and 12.6% had someone living alone who was 65 years of age or older. The average household size was 2.46 and the average family size was 3.03.

The median age in the city was 38.5 years. 27% of residents were under the age of 18; 5.5% were between the ages of 18 and 24; 27.1% were from 25 to 44; 24.8% were from 45 to 64; and 15.6% were 65 years of age or older. The gender makeup of the city was 49.7% male and 50.3% female.

2000 census

As of the census of 2000, there were 514 people, 195 households, and 141 families living in the city. The racial makeup of the city was 99.42% White, 0.19% Native American, 0.19% Asian, and 0.19% from two or more races. Hispanic or Latino of any race were 0.58% of the population.

There were 195 households, out of which 37.9% had children under the age of 18 living with them, 60.5% were married couples living together, 7.7% had a female householder with no husband present, and 27.2% were non-families. 25.6% of all households were made up of individuals, and 15.4% had someone living alone who was 65 years of age or older. The average household size was 2.64 and the average family size was 3.15.

30.9% are under the age of 18, 6.0% from 18 to 24, 27.6% from 25 to 44, 20.0% from 45 to 64, and 15.4% who were 65 years of age or older. The median age was 36 years. For every 100 females, there were 91.1 males. For every 100 females age 18 and over, there were 87.8 males.

The median income for a household in the city was $29,375, and the median income for a family was $37,750. Males had a median income of $28,125 versus $18,125 for females. The per capita income for the city was $14,469. About 7.5% of families and 6.7% of the population were below the poverty line, including 3.6% of those under age 18 and 18.4% of those age 65 or over.

Education

Delmar and Elwood Schools consolidated in 1962 to form the Delwood Community Schools. Delwood began whole-grade sharing with nearby Maquoketa in the 1980s, Students in grades 7-12 attend Maquoketa, while grades Pre-K through 6 remain at the Delwood School in Delmar.

See also

The following buildings in Delmar are listed on the National Register of Historic Places:

Chicago, Milwaukee, St. Paul & Pacific Depot- Delmar
Delmar Calaboose

Notes

References

External links

City website
City-Data Comprehensive statistical data and more about Delmar

Cities in Iowa
Cities in Clinton County, Iowa
1871 establishments in Iowa
Populated places established in 1871